Gustav "Guggi" Wieser was an Austrian footballer and coach.

References

External links
 Rapid Archiv
 Austria Archiv

Year of birth missing
Year of death missing
Austrian footballers
Austria international footballers
Association football forwards
SK Rapid Wien players
FK Austria Wien players
Austrian football managers
Eintracht Frankfurt managers
FC Schalke 04 managers
Legia Warsaw managers
Ruch Chorzów managers
Expatriate football managers in Poland
Austrian expatriate sportspeople in Poland